K50 Airstrip is an airstrip in the Lower Shabelle region of Somalia. It serves the capital city, Mogadishu, and was at times its main airport.

Overview
The name refers to its location on the country's main NE/SW road, about 50 kilometres south-west of Mogadishu. In the late 2000s, K50 served as Mogadishu's main airport while Aden Adde International Airport was briefly shut down due to the ongoing War in Somalia. Daallo Airlines operated routes to and from K50 at one time.

The airstrip was mentioned in the book Quiet Warriors: Veteran's Military Service Memories, written by Blake E. Edwards.

Facilities

Airlines and destinations
The following airlines offer scheduled passenger service:

References

External links
 Aeronautical chart at SkyVector

Airports in Somalia
Lower Shabelle
Mogadishu